Faverolles-en-Berry (literally Faverolles in Berry; before 2017: Faverolles) is a former commune in the Indre department in central France. On 1 January 2019, it was merged into the new commune Villentrois-Faverolles-en-Berry.

Population

See also
Communes of the Indre department

References

Former communes of Indre